The Chahed Cabinet is the 29th government of the Tunisian Republic, which was declared on 20 August 2016. The Government was approved on 27 August 2016 by a majority of 167 of total 217 legislators of Tunisia's Assembly of the Representatives of the People.The unity government consists of 26 ministers and 14 secretaries of state and includes independents, members of Nidaa Tounes, Ennahdha, Afek Tounes, Al-Massar, Al Joumhouri, El Moubadra, Democratic Alliance.

Cabinet members

References

Chahed
Cabinets established in 2016
2016 in Tunisian politics
2016 establishments in Tunisia
Cabinets disestablished in 2020
2020 disestablishments in Tunisia